HMS H28 was a British H-class submarine built by Vickers Limited, Barrow-in-Furness, as part of the Batch 3 H-class submarines. She was laid down on 18 March 1917 and was commissioned on 29 June 1918. H28 was the only British submarine to see active service in both World Wars, and was finally scrapped in 1944.

Design

H28 was fitted with an anti-aircraft gun and four  torpedo tubes. Its torpedo tubes were fitted to the bows and the submarine was loaded with eight 21-inch torpedoes. It is a Holland 602 type submarine but was designed to meet Royal Navy specifications. Its complement was twenty-two crew members.

Service
Following her commissioning, H28 saw active service in the final months of the First World War with the 8th Submarine Flotilla, based at Great Yarmouth. In 1919, she joined the 3rd Submarine Flotilla based at Portsmouth, however, the flotilla deployed to the Baltic Sea in September 1919 under Captain Max Horton as part of the Allied intervention in the Russian Civil War, where they remained until the sea froze over, returning to Britain on 2 January 1920. The flotilla relocated to Devonport in 1922. In 1927, H28 transferred to the 5th Submarine Flotilla at Gosport, where she was listed as being in reserve the following year, active in 1933 and in reserve again in 1938. During one of her periods of active service, during a visit by her flotilla to Ghent, H28 collided with the British steamer Vale of Mowbray in the Ghent–Terneuzen Canal on 28 May 1929. Both ships sustained minor damage, with H28 damaged above the waterline.

H28 was reactivated at the start of the Second World War, making her the only British submarine to see front line service in both conflicts. In 1939, she was still listed with the 5th Submarine Flotilla in the training role at Gosport, but following a refit at Sheerness, joined other H-class submarines at Harwich in September 1940. Joining H28 at this time was Sub-Lieutenant Edward Preston Young, who was the first Royal Naval Volunteer Reserve (RNVR) officer ever to be admitted to the Submarine Service. Following  the fall of France in June 1940, these training submarines undertook operational patrols in the North Sea as an anti-invasion precaution. On 11 October 1940, H28 commanded by Lieutenant E A Woodward, unsuccessfully fired four torpedoes at a small enemy merchant ship off the Netherlands coast, and subsequently escaped after being depth-charged by escort vessels. Following the loss of  shortly afterwards, operational patrols by the other H-class submarines were suspended, and the flotilla moved to Rothesay on the River Clyde in December 1940 to resume training duties. These included giving new officers and ratings seagoing experience, as well as providing live targets for escort vessels practicing anti-submarine techniques.

On 18 August 1944 H28 was sold for demolition, and then broken up at Troon, Scotland.

See also
 List of submarines of the Second World War

References

Bibliography
 
 
 
 
 

 

British H-class submarines
Ships built in Barrow-in-Furness
1918 ships
World War I submarines of the United Kingdom
World War II submarines of the United Kingdom
Royal Navy ship names